Samuel Chepkonga is a Kenyan politician from the United Democratic Alliance who has been member of the National Assembly for the Ainabkoi constituency since 2022.

He was elected MP for Eldoret East in 2013 from the United Republican Party.

See also 

 11th Parliament of Kenya
 13th Parliament of Kenya

References 

Living people
Year of birth missing (living people)
Members of the 11th Parliament of Kenya
Members of the 13th Parliament of Kenya
United Democratic Alliance (Kenya) politicians
21st-century Kenyan politicians
People from Uasin Gishu County
United Republican Party (Kenya) politicians